Soobrazitelny was a  of the Soviet Navy.

Development and design 

Late 1950s and 1960s - this is an era of great changes in the history of the navy, an era of new opportunities and new weapons. This was primarily due to the emergence of sea-based nuclear missiles, which turned submarines into strategic weapons. The appearance of nuclear power plants on submarines has greatly increased their autonomy, cruising range, underwater speed and, as a consequence, the severity of the threat they create.

From the very beginning, two options for the main power plant were considered - a traditional steam turbine (STU) and a gas turbine (GTU). The latter, due to its lightness and compactness (specific gravity 5.2 kg / l. From. Versus 9 kg / l. From.), Reduced the ship's displacement from 3600 to 3200 tons and increased efficiency. In addition, starting from a cold state took 5–10 minutes for the GTU compared to the several hours required for the STU. For these reasons, the option with gas turbine engines was adopted.

The armament of the new ship was innovative. For the first time in Soviet shipbuilding, it was equipped with two anti-aircraft missile systems (M-1 "Volna"). Each complex consisted of a two-boom launcher ZIF-101, a Yatagan control system and a magazine with two rotating drums for 8 V-600 missiles each.

Construction and career 
Soobrazitelny was laid down on 22 January 1963, and launched on 11 September 1964 by 61 Communards Shipyard in Nikolayev. She was commissioned on 26 December 1963.

On 3 July 1992, she was decommissioned and scrapped in 1994.

References 

1961 ships
Cold War destroyers of the Soviet Union
Ships built at Shipyard named after 61 Communards
Kashin-class destroyers